Andrew Marshall is a Journalist and Radio DJ from Britain, who has worked for both the BBC and ILR stations. In the 1980s he made shows for Radio Mercury, which included Andrew Marshall Meets The Stars, a Sunday afternoon show which usually would feature an interview with at least one famous person among other people with lesser claims to fame, on occasions the show did feature some of the biggest names in both the UK and United States.

Marshall also presented shows on County Sound in the 1990s and was a regular stand-in presenter for Martin Campbell on his country music show, "Country Plus." After he left Mercury and County Sound (by this time the stations had merged), he became a freelance journalist. Openly gay, his credits as a writer include "Together Forever?", a book about homosexual relationships.

References

Year of birth missing (living people)
Living people
British journalists